This is list of the ships which participated in the International Fleet Review 2016 (IFR 2016) in Visakhapatnam, India.

Indian Navy

Aircraft carriers

Frigates

Destroyers

Submarines

Corvettes

Patrol boats

Sailing vessels

Replenishment oilers

Amphibious warfare ships

Other ships

Indian Coast Guard

Foreign ships

Australia

Bangladesh

Brazil

China

France

Indonesia

Iran

Japan

Maldives

Mauritius

Myanmar

Nigeria

Oman

Russia

Seychelles

South Africa

Sri Lanka

Thailand

United Kingdom

United States

Vietnam

See also
Indian Navy
Fleet review
List of ships present at International Fleet Review 2013
List of ships present at International Fleet Review, 2005
List of ships present at International Festival of the Sea, 2005

References

Lists of ships
India-related lists
Indian Navy
2016 in foreign relations of India